Brad Miska is an American film producer and founder of Bloody Disgusting, a horror genre website known for covering horror films, video games, comics, and music. His films include the V/H/S trilogy of anthology horror films, Under The Bed, A Horrible Way to Die and Southbound.

Career 

Miska founded Bloody Disgusting in 2001 (under the pseudonym "Mr. Disgusting") with co-founder Tom Owen. Together, they run the site along with Adam Dodd and Jonathan Barkan. By 2007, the site had 1.5 million unique visitors and 20 million page views each month. In September 2007 a minority stake was purchased by The Collective, a Beverly Hills–based management company. In 2011 Bloody Disgusting began distributing and producing films  that have gone on to win awards and spawned the successful V/H/S franchise.

Bloody Disgusting has worked on projects with genre writers, directors, and actors including Adam Wingard, Simon Barrett, David Bruckner, Gregg Bishop, Roxanne Benjamin, Joe Swanberg, AJ Bowen, Amy Seimetz, Ti West, Radio Silence, Glenn McQuaid, Steven C Miller, Jonny Weston, Jason Eisner, Eduardo Sanchez, Greg Hale, Gareth Evans, Timo Tjahjanto, Marcel Sarmiento, Nacho Vigalondo, Patrick Horvath, Sion Sono, and Trent Haaga.

Bloody Disgusting Selects

In 2011, Bloody Disgusting partnered with AMC Networks and The Collective to create a distribution company named Bloody Disgusting Selects, releasing genre films in AMC theaters and on DVD, Blu-ray, and VOD platforms. Films distributed via Bloody Disgusting Selects films are:

 Alyce Kills
 Atrocious (Directed by Fernando Barreda Luna)
 Blood Runs Cold
 Chop
 Coldfish
 Crawl
 Delivery
 Exit Humanity
 Fever Night
 The Haunting of Helena
 Hellacious Acres
 Macabre
 Outcast
 The Pack
 Phase 7
 Rammbock
 Truth or Die
 The Woman (Directed by Lucky McKee, written by Jack Ketchum)
 Yellowbrickroad (winner best film at the 2010 New York City Horror Film Festival)

Filmography
 A Horrible Way to Die (associate producer) - premiered at the 2010 Toronto International Film Festival. It also played at Fantastic Fest[3] where it received three major awards: Best Screenplay for Simon Barrett, Best Actor for AJ Bowen and Best Actress for Amy Seimetz
 V/H/S (concept, producer) - premiered at the 2012 Sundance Film Festival
 Under the Bed (producer) - premiered at the 2012 Fantasia International Film Festival
 V/H/S/2 (concept, producer) - premiered at the 2013 Sundance Film Festival
 V/H/S: Viral (concept, producer) - premiered at the 2014 Fantastic Fest film festival
 Southbound (producer, actor) - premiered at the 2015 Toronto International Film Festival
 Siren (producer) - premiered at the 2016 Horror Channel FrightFest
 V/H/S/94 (concept, producer) - premiered at the 2021 Fantastic Fest film festival
 V/H/S/99 (producer) - premiered at the 2022 Toronto International Film Festival
 Kids vs. Aliens (producer) - premiered at the 2022 Fantastic Fest film festival

References

External links

 Bloody Disgusting

Living people
American film producers
Year of birth missing (living people)
Place of birth missing (living people)